Federal Highway 40, (Carretera Federal, Fed. 40) also called the Carretera Interoceánica (Interoceanic Highway), is a road beginning at Reynosa, Tamaulipas, just west of the Port of Brownsville, Texas, and ending at Fed. 15 in Villa Unión, Sinaloa, near Mazatlán and the Pacific coast. It is called Interoceanic as, once finished, the cities of Matamoros, Tamaulipas, on the Gulf of Mexico and Mazatlán on the Pacific Ocean will be linked.

It passes through Monterrey, Nuevo León; Saltillo, Coahuila; Torreón; Gómez Palacio and Durango City. The Monterrey to Durango City section is a four-lane divided highway. The rest of the road is a two-lane undivided road. Parallel to this highway, in some sections, runs Fed. 40D, a four-lane restricted-access toll road.

The Cadereyta Jiménez massacre occurred on 13 May 2012 along the road outside the city of Monterrey.

Route

Reynosa to Monterrey
From Reynosa, Tamaulipas, to La Junta, Nuevo León, the roadway is a 4-lane divided unrestricted access road. At La Junta the highway is separated into Fed. 40 and Fed. 40D. Fed. 40 continues as a 2-lane undivided road, passing through several small towns including:
Peña Blanca, Nuevo León
General Bravo, Nuevo León
China, Nuevo León
Cadereyta Jiménez, Nuevo León

Monterrey to Saltillo
From Monterrey, Nuevo León, to Saltillo, Coahuila, Fed. 40 is a 4-lane divided unrestricted access road. The highway crosses the northern end of the Sierra Madre Oriental that divides Coahuila and Nuevo León.

Saltillo to Torreón
From Saltillo the road continues west as a 4-lane unrestricted access road. After the town of El Mesón, the road splits into the 4-lane toll Road Fed. 40D and a 2-lane undivided unrestricted Fed. 40. Both roads merge again in the town of 28 de Agosto and begin another section of 4-lane divided unrestricted highway. A few kilometers ahead is the road junction south to Parras de la Fuente. At La Cuchilla the road splits again into Fed. 40 and Fed. 40D. From there, one may take Fed. 30 to San Pedro, which eventually becomes a 4-lane divided unrestricted road and leads directly to northern Torreón. At the city of Matamoros, Fed. 40 and Fed. 40D merge again into a 4-lane divided unrestricted highway until one reaches Torreón.

This section is the east-west section across the central Mexican Plateau.

Torreon to Gómez Palacio
Torreon, Coahuila, and Gómez Palacio, Durango, form a metro area. At Gómez Palacio, Fed. 40 merges with Fed. 49 that comes from the north. At Gómez Palacio one can choose between Fed's 40 or 49 and Feds 40D or 49D; both roads are 4-lane divided until the first toll plaza.

Gómez Palacio to Durango
At Gómez Palacio one can choose between the toll road and the unrestricted road. At Cuencamé, Durango, the roads splits: Fed. 49 continues south to Zacatecas and Mexico City, and Fed. 40 continues west to Durango.

Durango to Mazatlán
This section of the highway crosses the Sierra Madre Occidental, and is narrow with many curves, particularly the portion known as the Espinazo del Diablo west of the Sierra crest. It has recently been bypassed by the new Fed. 40D. The old Fed. 40 can take up to 8 hours to travel, while Fed. 40D should only take 3 hours. During the winter months there is the added danger of ice. When going eastbound, Mazatlán to Durango, after reaching the top of the Sierra Madre Occidental, Fed. 40 becomes more linear, and it goes through the towns of La Ciudad, El Salto, and El Soldado. It continues linear up to a point around 30 kilometers from Durango, and it again goes downhill with many curves. In all the downhill sections, the use of engine brake is advised.

Current developments

New highway
The improvement of the corridor between Durango and Mazatlán will shorten travel time between them by as much as 6 hours. The highway will pass through and over the Sierra Madre Occidental through 63 new tunnels and 115 new bridges. The most important is the Baluarte Bridge (finished in 2012), which is now the highest bridge in North America at 390 meters. The bridge is located at the border between Sinaloa and Durango states formed by the Baluarte River.

Security is expected to be greatly enhanced in this region, due to quicker access and mobility of the military. It was inaugurated by President Enrique Peña Nieto on October 17, 2013, and has been fully operational since then. The time to travel from Durango City to Mazatlan takes slightly under two and one-half hours.

References

040
1040
Sierra Madre Occidental